The Chehalis people or Tsihalis are a native people of western Washington state in the United States. They should not be confused with the similarly named Chehalis First Nation of the Sts'Ailes people along the Harrison River in the Fraser Valley area of British Columbia.

"Ts-a-lis" ("place of sand") or "Chi-ke-lis" ("shifting sands") is the Lower Chehalis word for a historic native village at today Westport. Early European explorers pronounced the word "Chehalis" and gave this name to the river and the people living upriver who later became the "Chehalis people" or "People of the Sands".

The Chehalis people of Washington consists of two divisions, speaking two distinct languages, which were not mutually intelligible: The Upper Chehalis or Kwaiailk and the Lower Chehalis, the boundary between the two groups was the confluence of the Chehalis River and Satsop River.

Today, Chehalis people are enrolled in the federally recognized Confederated Tribes of the Chehalis Reservation (Upper and Lower Chehalis), the Quinault Tribe of the Quinault Reservation (predominantly Lower Chehalis), Shoalwater Bay Tribe (Lower Chehalis), and Cowlitz Indian Tribe (Upper Chehalis). 
Chehalis-Population estimates in United States (2019) counts about 300 Upper Chehalis, and 550 Lower Chehalis.

Tribal lands and Chehalis bands or village groups 
The "Upper Chehalis bands" hunted from the mountains, across the prairies, and fished the Cowlitz, Upper Chehalis, Newaukum, Skookumchuck, Black, and Satsop rivers, the "Lower Chehalis bands" fished the Middle and Lower Chehalis, Wynoochee, Wishkah, Humptulips, Elk, Johns, Hoquiam, North, Willapa, Niawiakum, and Palix rivers to Grays Harbor and in the Lower Puget Sound. Like many Northwest Coast natives, the Chehalis relied on fishing from local rivers for food and built plank houses (longhouses) to protect themselves from the harsh, wet winters west of the Cascade Mountains.

Lower Chehalis bands or village groups (from the Pacific coast westward inland to below the Satsop River mouth into Chehalis River; with their dependence on natural resources like cedar and fish, especially on Pacific salmon, living in compact villages composed of Plank houses they differed little from their Coast Salish neighbors of the Pacific Northwest Coast):

 Copalis (on Copalis River and the Pacific Coast between the mouth of Joe Creek and Grays Harbor, in 1805, Lewis and Clark estimated a population of 200 Copalis in 10 houses, the 5 individuals assigned to a "Chepalis" tribe in an enumeration given by Olson of the year 1888 probably refers to them. Most Copalis are part of the Quinault Tribe of the Quinault Reservation, other Copalis descent are enrolled with the Confederated Tribes of the Chehalis Reservation)
 Humptulips (on the Humptulips River, and part of Grays Harbor, including also Hoquiam River and Wishkah River (Hwish-kahl), meaning "stinking water", today part of the  Quinault Tribe of the Quinault Reservation, the Shoalwater Bay Tribe, and Confederated Tribes of the Chehalis Reservation)
 Hli'mtimi (near North Cove on north coast of Willapa Bay)
 Hooshkal (on the north shore of Grays Harbor)
 Hoquiam (from Ho'-kwee-um or Ho-kwim - "hungry for wood", name of a Chehalis village at present Hoquiam, Washington, named because of the great amount of driftwood at the mouth of the Hoquiam River)
 Kishkallen (on the north shore of Grays Harbor)
 Klimmim (Gibbs), 1877, no location mentioned)
 Kplelch (at the mouth of North River into Willapa Bay)
 Kwapks (at the mouth of North River)
 Mo'niltimsh (at Georgetown)
 Nooachhummik (on the coast north of Grays Harbor)
 Nookalthu (north of Grays Harbor)
 Nu'moihanhl (at Tokeland, Washington on north coast of Willapa Bay, named after 19th century Chief Toke)
 Whiskah or Whishkah (lived along Wishkah River, a tributary of the Chehalis River)
 Wynoochee (on Wynoochee River, today part of the Confederated Tribes of the Chehalis Reservation and the Quinault Tribe of the Quinault Reservation)

Upper Chehalis bands or village groups (along the Satsop River and above its mouth westward upriver the Chehalis River, they depended more on wild plants and edible vegetables or fruits (camassia, serviceberry, chokecherry, huckleberry, and wild strawberry), fish, especially salmon, and game, and had seasonal villages, by 1800 they had adopted the Horse, allowing them to enlarge their trade and groups of hunters rode far to hunt deer, and elk, their culture therefore resembles that of their Interior Salish neighbors of the Northwest Plateau):

 Satsop (along Satsop River, today part of the Confederated Tribes of the Chehalis Reservation)
 Kwaiailk (Q'ʷay'áyiłq') or Upper Chehalis proper (Kwaiailk / Q'ʷay'áyiłq''' was the name of one of at least four bands of Upper Chehalis, they inhabited the Upper Chehalis River country, an area that extended from Cloquallam Creek to the Upper Chehalis River, above the Satsop River, and on the Cowlitz River, they spoke two dialects - Oakville Chehalis dialect west of Grand Mound, Washington, and Tenino Chehalis dialect'' southeast of Grand Mound. In 1855, according to Gibbs, they numbered 216, but were becoming amalgamated with the Cowlitz, today most are part of the Cowlitz Indian Tribe, some also Confederated Tribes of the Chehalis Reservation)

Language
The Lower and Upper Chehalis languages belong to the Coast Salish family of languages among Northwest Coast indigenous peoples.

Reservation
The Chehalis people settled on their current Chehalis Indian Reservation along the Chehalis River in 1860. The reservation has a land area of 18.188 km² (7.022 sq mi) in southeastern Grays Harbor and southwestern Thurston Counties. As of the 2000 census its resident population was 691 persons. The major communities within the reservation are Chehalis Village and part of the city of Oakville. In the 2010 census, the population increased to 853 members. 639 of them were full-blooded.

References

Chehalis Reservation, Washington United States Census Bureau

External links
 Confederated Tribes of the Chehalis Reservation, official website
 Confederated Tribes of the Chehalis Reservation, official website

Native American tribes in Washington (state)
Coast Salish